Róisín Garvey (born 5 July 1973) is an Irish Green Party politician who has served as a Senator since June 2020, after being nominated by the Taoiseach.

Early life
Garvey grew up in Inagh and attended Coláiste Muire, Ennis and NUI Galway. Her father, Flan Garvey, was a Fianna Fáil member of Clare County Council between 1985 and 2009. Garvey formerly worked for An Taisce.

Political career
She previously served as a member of Clare County Council from 2019 to 2020.

Garvey was an unsuccessful Green Party candidate in the 2020 general election for the Clare constituency. A fluent Irish speaker, she represented the Greens on the Irish-language TV debate on TG4 prior to that election.

On 24 March 2021, Garvey was one of three Green Party senators to table a motion of no confidence against party chairperson Hazel Chu, after Chu announced her candidacy in a Seanad bye-election as an independent.

Personal life
She has one son.

References

1973 births
Living people
Members of the 26th Seanad
21st-century women members of Seanad Éireann
Politicians from County Clare
Green Party (Ireland) senators
Nominated members of Seanad Éireann
Local councillors in County Clare